Grafton is an unincorporated community in York County, Virginia, United States, on the Virginia Peninsula.  As of the 2010 Census, the Grafton postal area (ZIP Code 23692) had a population of 18,846.

History 
Originally known as Cockletown, the citizens voted to change the name of the community in honor of the only church in the area. That church was administered by a pastor from Grafton, Massachusetts, who put forth his hometown's name for consideration; the measure was adopted in 1783. By renaming their town, the citizens unknowingly named their community after the 3rd Duke of Grafton, Prime Minister Lord Augustus FitzRoy, who served as the head of government for the United Kingdom 1768–1770.

It is known as the childhood home of Shelly Rollo Roman, wife of Bill Roman.

External links 
 York County Virginia Local Government

Unincorporated communities in Virginia
Unincorporated communities in York County, Virginia